The AJAX (acronym for the "Associated Judaean Athletic Clubs".) Football Club is an Australian rules football club sited in the inner suburb of St Kilda, Victoria. The squad competes in the Victorian Amateur Football Association (VAFA).

Having been established by the Melbourne Jewish community in 1957, Ajax is notable as Australia's first and only fully Jewish club in the sport The club has also a junior section, founded in 1974. Their junior teams compete in the South Metro  Junior Football League (SMJFL).

Club Presidents
Maurice Ashkenazy (1980-1985)

History
Jewish presence in Australia dates back to 1788, with the arrival of Jewish convicts during the penal era. Melbourne's Jewish community embraced Australian Rules football as a way to be integrated into Australian society and share a common activity.

Most of Melbourne's Jewish community initially lived in the inner suburbs of Carlton and Fitzroy, although the Jewish community then spread to St Kilda and Caulfield.

In 1955, Daryl Cohen, a football enthusiast playing for Old Collegians, proposed a new team formed by Jewish members to compete in the VAFA. The club was named Associated Judaean Athletic Clubs (acronym "AJAX") and was admitted into the association in 1957. The club adopted the St Kilda FC's red, white and black colors. St Kilda president donated a set of guernseys for the club. The Christian cross of the St Kilda badge would be replaced by a star of David.

AJAX would be embrace by the Jewish community as their own team, establishing as a strong team in the region.

References

External links
 Official site

Jews and Judaism in Melbourne
Victorian Amateur Football Association clubs
1957 establishments in Australia
Australian rules football clubs established in 1957
Diaspora sports clubs
Australian rules football clubs in Melbourne
Sport in the City of Port Phillip
St Kilda, Victoria